John Lewis Ashcroft  FAIHA (1 February 1927 – 19 May 2021) was an Australian country music and folk entertainer, singer, songwriter, and musician, who also recorded pop, skiffle, jazz, and disco as his alter ego, the Baron. He was married to fellow performer Gay Kayler, with whom he recorded on numerous occasions.

Career

1927–1953: Early personal and show business background 
As a child growing up during the Great Depression in Australia, Ashcroft lived in a bag shack with a dirt floor. An interest in Indigenous cultures, in particular Australian Aboriginal culture, was possibly influenced by these humble beginnings. (See The Imagine That! Australiana Show example in Production Shows below.)  

During World War II, Ashcroft began his career by playing guitar and singing mainly bush ballads. Ashcroft's first recording took place in 1946. It was "When I Waltzed My Matilda Away", and was distributed solely for radio airplay. [https://www.johnnyashcroft.com.au/JohnnyAshcroft.htm Australia's Amateur Hour and First Recording.

In the mid-1940s he traveled with vaudeville shows. While working in The Great Levante Show, he learned about show business traditions and the psychology of live performing from the Great Levante (Les Cole) and one of Australia's greatest vaudevillian comics, Bobby Lebrun. Bobby Lebrun Mo Fellowship Award

1954–1972: Early recordings 
In 1954, Ashcroft laid down his first commercial recordings, six 78rpm sides for Rodeo Records. This was followed by his debut album Songs of the Western Trail in 1956, which was Australia’s and New Zealand’s first country and western vinyl microgroove album. It contained Highway 31, Australia’s and New Zealand’s first trucking song. 

Ashcroft was the first Australian country artist to appear on Australian TV. In 1956, as the Australian Broadcasting Corporation (then Commission) began transmitting from its tiny Arcon Studio at Gore Hill, Sydney, Johnny wrote and sang the show's title theme, Crazy Cross. He also performed in the show, which was set in Sydney's Kings Cross, New South Wales, with actor Gordon Chater serving as its anchorman. Pre-television Tests and Australia's First C&W Television Performer    

In 1957, Ashcroft recorded Gordon Parsons's, A Pub with No Beer with Graeme Bell. Catalogue No. Bell 156 (EP) This 45rpm was also released in the USA and during a beer strike in Canada. It was not only available on vinyl but anecdotally sold 110,000 copies in Australia, on plastic-coated cardboard records.    

They're a Weird Mob, recorded in late 1958, also included the doyens of Australian jazz: Graeme Bell, Don Burrows, John Sangster, George Thompson, Ron Falson together with Noel Smith from the Royal Ballet Orchestra. This skiffle song became Ashcroft's first hit single. For details.         

Although the term had not yet been coined, Ashcroft's 1960 song, Little Boy Lost, was Australia's first country-rock song. Again, it was arranged and recorded by jazzmen, including guitarist George Golla. This song, written by Ashcroft from DJ Tony Withers's idea, tells the story of Steven Walls who became lost from his parents' property at Tubbamurra near Guyra, NSW. Five thousand people and seven aircraft, together with Aboriginal tracker William Stanley, searched the rugged bush country, which was rife with dingos and deadly snakes. He was found alive and well four days later. The search for the Little Boy Lost continues to be Australia's biggest land and air search.

At the height of Little Boy Lost's success, Ashcroft withdrew his recording from airplay out of consideration for the family of 8-year old Graeme Thorne, the victim of Australia's first kidnapping. 

Little Boy Lost was Australia's first 45rpm Gold Record, and New Zealand's first Gold Record. The painting, Little Boy Lost by Sir Sidney Nolan, hangs in the Broken Hill Regional Art Gallery. Accession No. 1984.0001    

His album Mostly Folk, recorded in the mid-1960s, was re-released under the title, Little Boy Lost and went Gold. Mostly Folk, Cat. No.: Columbia 330SX 7734, and Little Boy Lost, Cat. No.: Columbia OEX 9511 are identical

The Little Boy Lost movie had its world premiere on 16 November 1978 at Armidale in the New England region of NSW. Johnny Ashcroft recorded a new version of Little Boy Lost with Gay Kayler, which was played at the end. They also recorded the voices on the movie sound track. Ashcroft made a fleeting cameo appearance as one of the exhausted searchers by the camp fire.       

Johnny Ashcroft was the first country artist in Australia to have Gold Records presented on stage, when three were bestowed simultaneously before a live audience in Tamworth, NSW, in 1971. During the ceremony, Ashcroft suggested that Tamworth might consider annual country music record-award presentations in that city. Consequently, two years later, in 1973, Tamworth began promoting itself as Australia's Country Music Capital. With Golden Guitars designed by John Minson, Tamworth had started its journey to eventually become recognised as one of the world's top ten music festivals (2002). History of Country Music in Australia

1973–1990: Continued success 
In 1973, Johnny Ashcroft and Gay Kayler (Kahler) commenced working together, and recorded their Faces Of Love album. Each featured in solo performances and duets. 

That same year, Ashcroft recorded his fourth hit – an American pop song, Clint Holmes's Playground In My Mind, which made No. 1 on general charts.

In January 1974, Johnny and Gay performed at the Sydney Opera House, four months after its opening, when they topped the bill in the first all-Australian country music show, as part of the Australian Festival of Performing Arts. Eight weeks later they starred in the Australian Variety Show, again in the main Concert Hall of the Sydney Opera House. Both shows were markedly different. They appeared eight times in this iconic venue.Official website of Johnny Ashcroft & Gay Kayler 

Ashcroft's 1975 song, Holy Joe the Salvo, became the Salvation Army's 1975 Red Shield Appeal Song. Its popularity was responsible for the Sallys becoming known as the Salvos. 

Also in 1975, Johnny Ashcroft wrote Australia's first female trucking song, My Home-Coming Trucker's Coming Home, for Gay Kayler to record. It became a country hit, which was also programmed into general airplay. More information 

Johnny's 1978 LP And The Band Played Waltzing Matilda, included a faithful cover-reproduction of Fredrick McCubbin's 1889 painting, Down On His Luck. 

In another departure from modern country music, Ashcroft appeared on the album, A Time for Change, as his disco-singing alter ego, the Baron. The album also featured Gay Kayler, Ashcroft's partner (and wife), as Lady Finflingkington, the Baron's jazz-scatting, eccentric consort. From this LP, the Baron released Sixteen Tons of Hit the Road Jack, a 12-inch disco single. For album and disco single information
 
In 1989, the milestone historical album, The Cross of the Five Silver Stars, featuring Johnny Ashcroft, Gay Kayler, Bettybo and their musical director, Rob (Shep) Davis, was a finalist for the Heritage Award in Tamworth’s Australasian Country Music Awards.  See 'Changing Times'

Production Shows
Johnny Ashcroft combined a major part of his career with Australian country music star, Gay Kayler, whom he married in 1981. Although they created a reputation as a show-stopping duo, they still retained their individuality by incorporating solo highlights within their performances.

Their production shows, such as The Imagine That! Australiana Show, Here's To You, Australia!, The Goodtime Gotcha Show and Everything But The Drover's Dog, often included comedy segments with Gay and Johnny as themselves, and also as their alter egos, The Baron and Lady Finflingkington (The Baron's consort), who sang disco.

Parallel with their adult production shows, Johnny Ashcroft and Gay Kayler spent eleven years presenting Australian history to more than 750,000 school children with songs, stories and visuals in their NSW Education Department accredited shows.
In 2004, Johnny and Gay were adopted into the Gamilaraay Nation by Gamilaraay elder, Centennial Medal holder and United Nations keynote speaker, Barbara Flick, because of their 'ground-breaking' presentations of Australia's First Nations people, both traditional and present day, and for their stance against racism. See "Raising Awareness and Pride in Australia’s Rich History"

Death 
Ashcroft died on 19 May 2021, aged 94.

Legacy
The Johnny Ashcroft and Gay Kayler Legacy Collection was presented to the Australian Country Music Hall of Fame in Tamworth (Gamilaraay Country) on 28 May 2022, with a Welcome to Country and Smoking Ceremony.

Nine Hundred and seventy-seven items, plus seventy-nine recordings, a variety of posters and eighteen recorded backgrounds joined their artefacts already in the Museum. Little Boy Lost, the Search, Song, Movie and Beyond (one hundred and three items) was part of this impressive Collection. Tamworth Regional Council news report

Discography

Albums (For 78rpms and 45rpms visit https://www.johnnyashcroft.com.au/JA_Discography.htm 
{| class="wikitable plainrowheaders" style="text-align:center;" border="1"
! scope="col" style="width:11em;"| Title
! scope="col" style="width:17em;"| Details
|-
! scope="row"| Songs of the Western Trail 
First vinyl C&W album recorded in Australia  Features Australia's first trucking song, Highway 31
|
 Released: 1956
 Label: Philips (P 10815 R)
|-
! scope="row"| Mostly Folk 
|
 Label: Columbia (330SX 7734) 
|-
! scope="row"| One More Time Around 
|
 Released: 1966
 Label: EMI Music (OEX 9442)
|-
! scope="row"| You And I – Country Style  Two Gold Records  (with Kathleen McCormack)
|
 Released: 1967
 Label: Columbia (SOEX-9463)
|-
! scope="row"| Little Boy Lost  Gold Record 
|
 Released: 1968
 Label: Columbia (SOEX-9510)
|-
! scope="row"| Johnny Ashcroft Now  Gold Record 
|
 Released: 1969
 Label: Columbia (SOEX-9564)
|-
! scope="row"| Our Kinda Country
(Featuring Little Boy Lost)
|
 Label: Columbia (SPR 1)
|-
! scope="row"| Johnny Ashcroft Unlimited 
|
 Released: 1970
 Label: Columbia (SOEX-9656)
|-
! scope="row"| Heaven Help Us All 
|
 Released: 1971
 Label: Columbia (SOEX-9823)
|-
! scope="row"| Johnny Ashcroft Live At Wentworthville Leagues Club 
|
 Released: 1971
 Label: Columbia (SOEX-9848)
|-
! scope="row"| Dusty Road
(Featuring Bullroarer)
|
 Label: MFP (A-8113) 
|-
! scope="row"| They All Died Game 
|
 Released: 1971
 Label: Music for Pleasure (MFP 8218)
|-
! scope="row"| Australian Songs Go Continental
(Features Ashcroft/Halford melodies from They All Died Game album)
|
 Label: Minstrel (LPMB 2005)
|-
! scope="row"| Johnny Ashcroft Country 
(Songs Based on Authentic Stories of Australian Bushrangers) 
|
 Released: 1972
 Label: Columbia (SOEX-9967)
|-
! scope="row"| Requests 
|
 Released: 1972
 Label: Axis (AXIS 6046)
|-
! scope="row"| Face of Love  (duets and solos with Gay Kayler) 
|
 Released: 1973
 Label: Columbia (SOEX-10089)
|-
! scope="row"| People, Places and Gertrude
(Featuring Johnny's true-story composition A Song For Danny with Gay Kayler)
|
 Released: 1975
 Label: RCA Victor (SP 164)
|-
! scope="row"| KY Country 2KY 50 Years
(Featuring Holy Joe, the Salvo)
|
 Released: 1975
 Label: RCA (VCL1-0101) 
|-
! scope="row"| I've Got a Thing About Trains
(With historic steam train sounds)
|
 Released: 1976
 Label: RCA Victor (SP 175)
|-
! scope="row"| And the Band Played Waltzing Matilda
|
 Released: 1977
 Label: RCA Victor (VPL1-0157)
|-
! scope="row"| Johnny Ashcroft in Little Boy Lost Country
Includes Little Boy Lost movie version (with Gay Kayler)
 Just Another Long Lost Love (with Gay Kayler)
 Street Singer (duet with Gay Kayler)
|
 Released: 1978
 Label: RCA Victor (VPL1-0173)
|-
! scope="row"| RCA Country Club Tamworth 1979
Featuring Heroes
|
 Released:1979
 Label: RCA (PROMO 43)
|-
! scope="row"| Country Cream
Featuring Old Blue Cattle Dog
 On the Inside (duet with Gay Kayler)
|
 Released: 1979
 Label: Selection PRML 011
|-
! scope="row"| Streetsinger
Featuring Street Singer (duet with Gay Kayler)
 Little Boy Lost movie version (with Gay Kayler)
 Just Another Long Lost Love (with Gay Kayler)
|
 Released: 1981
 Label: RCA Victor (DPL 609)
|-
! scope="row"|  A Time For Change(Featuring Imagine That!, duet with Gay Kayler,  and alter egos the Baron and Lady Finflingkington)
|
 Released: 1981
 Label: RCA (VAL1 0354)
|-
! scope="row"| Australia's Musical HeritageSydney Morning Herald’s 150th Anniversary
 (Featuring The Old Bark Hut)
 |
 Released: 1981
 Label: ABC (SMH150)
|-
! scope="row"| Australia Our Land Our Music(Featuring We'll All Die Game)
|
 Released: 1982
 Label: EMI (AUST.1-2)
|-
! scope="row"| A Tribute To Buddy Williams(Featuring Buddy Williams, Johnny Ashcroft and Gay Kayler)
|
 Released: 1985
 Label: Axis (AX.701410)  
|-
! scope="row"| The Cross of the Five Silver Stars  (with Gay Kayler, Bettybo and Shep Davis)
Finalist for the Heritage Award in the Australasian Country Music Awards
|
 Released: 1989
 Label: Jade Records (JADLP1009)
|-
! scope="row"| Sharing  Featuring The Fields Of Athenry (duet with Gay Kayler)
|
 Released: 1995
 Label: Selection (PCD 082)
|-
! scope="row"| They're a Weird Mob(Cover Notes by Gay Kayler)
|
 Released: 1999
 Label: Larrikin Records (D24116)

|-
! scope="row"| Johnny Ashcroft, Here's To You, Australia!28-track, double CD set with Gay Kayler, Bettybo & Shep Davis
|
 Released:2007
 Label: Rajon (CDR1066)
|}

 Awards 
Johnny Ashcroft was awarded the Medal of the Order Of Australia (OAM) in 1991 for his contribution to the Arts, the entertainment industry and Indigenous social justice.

In 1995, Ashcroft was appointed a Fellow of the Australian Institute of History and Arts (FAIHA), in recognition of “… his many years work in the field of Australian Performing Arts, whereby he has proved that he is an acknowledged leader….Future generations of Australians will forever be appreciative of this work, which has greatly enriched the archives of our country.” Australian Roll of Renown The Australasian Country Music Roll of Renown honours Australian and New Zealander musicians who have shaped the music industry by making a significant and lasting contribution to Country Music. It was inaugurated in 1976, and the inductee is announced at the Country Music Awards of Australia in Tamworth in January. Johnny Ashcroft's plaque states, ‘… The Johnny Ashcroft Show pioneered the breakthrough into the metropolitan registered club circuit.  He was influential in establishing country music in this substantial market’. 

|-
| 1986
| Johnny Ashcroft
| Australian Roll of Renown
| 

Mo AwardsThe Australian Entertainment Mo Awards (known informally as the Mo Awards), were annual Australian entertainment industry awards. They recognised excellence in on-stage performance and achievements in live entertainment in Australia from 1975 to 2016. Johnny Ashcroft received the first Country Male Entertainer'' Mo Award in 1979. 
 (wins only)
|-
| 1979
| Johnny Ashcroft
| Country Male Entertainer of the Year
| 
|-

References

External links
 
 Johnny Ashcroft Facebook
 Gay Kayler
 Australasian Country Music Roll of Renown
 Australasian Country Music – Hands of Fame
 Little Boy Lost listing in No.1 Hits of 1960
 Johnny Ashcroft recordings in National Film & Sound Archives
Little Boy Lost 1960 hit version in National Film & Sound Archives

Tamworth Capital News Editorial
Oral History in National Film & Sound Archive
Johnny Ashcroft’s suggestion gave birth to the Australasian Country Music Awards
Kelly Fuller, ABC New England North West, interviews Johnny on 50th Anniversary 7 Feb 2010
Spencer Howson, ABC Brisbane, interviews Johnny on 50th Anniversary 5 Feb 2010
Tim Cox, ABC Hobart, blog re Johnny Ashcroft & Gay Kayler and 50th Anniversary 11 Feb 2010
 
 

1927 births
2021 deaths
Australian country singers
Recipients of the Medal of the Order of Australia
Yodelers
Musicians from Sydney